The Case for Israel is a 2003 book by Alan Dershowitz, a law professor at Harvard University. The work is a response to common criticisms of Israel. The Case for Israel was a New York Times bestseller. Norman Finkelstein accused Dershowitz of plagiarizing central claims from Joan Peters's book From Time Immemorial.

Summary
The book is divided into several chapters, each of which addresses what Dershowitz identifies as being particularly strong accusations and myths about Israel, such as "Israel is the 'prime' human rights violator in the world" and "Israel is the cause of the Arab–Israeli conflict." Each chapter is divided into several sections. "The Accusation" states a common criticism of Israel, "The Accusers" lists several quotations from critics supporting the accusation, "The Reality" contains a short statement contradicting the accusation, and "The Proof" contains Dershowitz's explanation of his viewpoint. Edward Said and Noam Chomsky are among the critics that he quotes the most heavily. The research assistants mentioned in the book's acknowledgements include Natalie Hershlag, the birthname of Israeli-American actress Natalie Portman.

Dershowitz has released a sequel in 2005 championing the two-state solution. The book, The Case for Peace, explains what he believes is needed to be done in order to achieve peace in the Israeli–Palestinian conflict.

Norman Finkelstein's allegations of fraud

The political scientist Norman Finkelstein has claimed the book is a "hoax" and that some of its citations are plagiarized from From Time Immemorial, a 1984 book by Joan Peters.

After a heated exchange between the two on Democracy Now!, in which Finkelstein repeatedly accused Dershowitz of plagiarism and questioned his credentials to teach at Harvard University, Finkelstein released a book, Beyond Chutzpah: On the Misuse of Anti-Semitism and the Abuse of History, whose second part is about The Case for Israel. The book lists many examples of text that Finkelstein claims Dershowitz to have lifted from Peters. A Harvard Law School investigation led by former Harvard president Derek Bok found the plagiarism charges to be without merit. Finkelstein later agreed to delete all references to "plagiarism" from his book, instead writing that Dershowitz "lifted" or "appropriated" text from Peters, but said he only did it to avoid a lawsuit.

According to the international relations scholar Avi Shlaim, Finkelstein's charge of plagiarism "is proved in a manner that would stand up in court." In response to the feud between Dershowitz and Finkelstein, Frank Menetrez, a former editor-in-chief of the UCLA Law Review, published an analysis of the charges made against Finkelstein by Dershowitz, finding no merit in any single charge, and that, on the contrary, "Dershowitz is deliberately misrepresenting what Finkelstein wrote". In a follow-up analysis he concluded that he could find "no way of avoiding the inference that Dershowitz copied the quotation from Twain from Peters's From Time Immemorial, and not from the original source", as Dershowitz claimed.

The political scientist Michael Desch observed:

Not only did Dershowitz improperly present Peters's ideas, he may not even have bothered to read the original sources she used to come up with them. Finkelstein somehow managed to get uncorrected page proofs of The Case for Israel in which Dershowitz appears to direct his research assistant to go to certain pages and notes in Peters's book and place them in his footnotes directly (32, col. 3).

Although repeatedly being approached by third parties to debate the book, Dershowitz refused on the ground that he had a "longstanding policy against debating Holocaust deniers, revisionists, trivializers or minimizers".

See also
 Bibliography of the Arab–Israeli conflict
 The Case for Democracy
 Public diplomacy of Israel
 Right to Exist: a Moral Defense of Israel's Wars

References

External links
Search inside The Case for Israel for free via Amazon's Online Reader

Film of Dershowitz inspired on his book

2003 non-fiction books
Books about the Arab–Israeli conflict
Books about Israel
Israeli–Palestinian conflict books
Books involved in plagiarism controversies
Alan Dershowitz